Rachael Maureen Lampa (born January 8, 1985) is an American contemporary Christian singer, songwriter and record producer. At age 15, she rose to fame and critical acclaim in 2000 with the release of her debut album, Live for You.

Early life 
Lampa was born in Ann Arbor, Michigan but raised in Louisville, Colorado, a small city outside Boulder. Her father is Filipino and her mother is of Hungarian and Irish descent. She is the second oldest of four children. She and her three other siblings live in Nashville. In addition to being active in the music business, Lampa and her siblings run an organization called People Loving Nashville, whose mission is to feed and clothe the homeless of Nashville. Her parents both still live in Colorado. Lampa began singing as a toddler and learned to sing perfect harmony by the time she was four years of age. During her childhood, she was actively involved in performing throughout Colorado, winning competitions and singing the National Anthem at the major sports events. She was raised in a Catholic home and had a strong faith foundation as a child.

At age 14, she was discovered by Word Records A&R and producer, Brent Bourgeois, while attending (but not competing in) the Music in the Rockies, a Christian music conference in Colorado. This led to a bidding war among the Christian labels in Nashville, but she ultimately signed at the then-Sony-owned Word Records.

Music career

Early career: 2000–2003 
Lampa released her debut album Live for You in August 2000. The album became a huge hit, spawning four number one singles and winning a Dove Award for the number one hit "Blessed". She made several appearances to promote the album including appearances on The Tonight Show and The View as well as features on USA Today, Billboard, People, and Seventeen.  She was invited to sing at World Youth Day in Rome with Luis Fonsi, a song she originally recorded as a duet with Aaron Neville for his record. She has also toured with Stacie Orrico, Amy Grant, Vince Gill, Destiny's Child, Boyz II Men, Michael W. Smith, Switchfoot, and TobyMac, among others. Her song "If You Believe" was part of the soundtrack to A Walk to Remember, which was released in early 2002. In March 2002, she released her second album, Kaleidoscope. It also got positive reviews. Three of the singles released made it to the top five on the charts. The first single, "No Greater Love", made it to No. 2 on the contemporary Christian music (CCM) charts. "I'm All Yours" made it to the top five on the CCM charts. The fourth single was "Brand New Life". In October 2002 she released a remix album Blur, featuring remixes of her hit songs, as well as personal favorites.

2004–2010: Other music projects 
In July 2004, Lampa released her third studio album, Rachael Lampa produced by Tommy Sims. The album received praise among the critics for its diverse styles, which included contemporary, retro, acoustic, soul, R&B, and ska. It was also the first time that Lampa had written or co-written on every track. She served as executive producer for the album. Guest artists on the album included Robert Randolph, and Christian rapper T-Bone. Three singles were released from the album. "When I Fall" was the album's first single, reaching number seven on the Christian music charts. She toured most of the year for promotion.

In October 2005, she appeared on the album The Message, where she wrote and sang the song "Flag (Psalm 57 and 108)". In May 2006, Word Records released a greatest hits collection, titled, Blessed: The Best of Rachael Lampa. It features a seventeen-song collection of her best and favorite songs, from her four albums.  On October 6, 2006, Hidden Secrets, a film touted as the Christian version of The Big Chill debuted with Lampa starring as "Sally". Her co-stars included John Schneider from the television series The Dukes of Hazzard. Lampa performed four songs for the film: "When I Fall", "The Good Life", "No Other One" and "The Art". On June 5, 2007, Lampa revealed in a blog that she was writing and recording new songs for a new album, and that she was looking for a new label.  Lampa appeared in Christian rapper T-Bone's video for the song "Name Droppin", the first single of his album Bone-Appetit!.

In December 2009, Lampa released a Christmas EP, Three Songs for Christmas, exclusively to her website. Lampa released her first extended play Human independently on January 5, 2010.

Rachael also spent most of 2009 on tour as a background singer for Jordin Sparks a Jonas Brothers tour and Britney Spears tour.

2011–present 
In 2011, Lampa and Tyler Ward, produced a cover of "Rocketeer" by Far East Movement. She signed with Universal Music Christian Group and later released her fifth studio album, All We Need, on September 27, 2011. The lead single, "Remedy", was released on July 26, 2011.

Starting in August 2011, Lampa took part with a vocal group made up of fellow friends and musicians from Nashville called "The Collective" during the third season of the NBC musical reality show The Sing-Off. The Collective made it up to week six of the show before being eliminated from the series. On January 15, 2013, Lampa was featured in a music video with recording artist Jonathan Thulin. The song "Bombs Away" was co-written and stars Lampa. The video received critical and fan praise for its unique approach to the gospel. In June 2014, she provided special guest vocals on "Infinite", a single by Kevin Max.

In 2015, she began working as a backing vocalist for Irish singer/musician, Hozier. They toured extensively and internationally.  They appeared on Saturday Night Live, The Tonight Show Starring Jimmy Fallon, The Ellen DeGeneres Show, Jimmy Kimmel Live!, and Late Night with Seth Meyers, among others.  They also appeared on the Grammy's singing a collaboration with Annie Lennox, American Music Awards, and performed at the Glastonbury Festival.

In 2017, she began posting about working on new music. She released a cover of the hymn, "Turn Your Eyes Upon Jesus", late in the year and made it available on all major streaming platforms, and filmed a visual for the track.

In 2019, she released "Side of my Heart".

In 2022, she released "Perfectly Loved", featuring TobyMac. The single has currently reached a peak position of 3 on the Billboard Hot Christian Songs chart.

Personal life 
Lampa graduated from Monarch High School in May 2003. While in high school, she was a starting point guard for the girls basketball team. She married Brendan McCarthy on March 27, 2010. Lampa and singer, Stacie Orrico, are close friends. Lampa resides in Nashville. She has dipped in and out of recording and touring, both as the artist and the support. She has said that the periods of silence were for personal searching, for identity checks, and to maintain a true and authentic Christian faith. "There have been some trying moments, but I knew eventually I needed to stop distracting myself and really lean into it."  After almost two years on the road with Hozier, Lampa returned home and announced that she was expecting her first son, Jackson, who was born on September 18, 2016. Six years later on October 19th, 2022, Lampa had her second child and son, Leo Kai.

Discography 

Compilations
2006: Blessed: The Best of Rachael Lampa
2010: Top Ten

 Collaborations

 Music videos
 2000: "Live for You"
 2002: "Savior Song"
 2004: "When I Fall"
 2011: "Remedy"
 2013: "Bombs Away"

Awards and nominations

References

External links 
 
 

1985 births
American child singers
American musicians of Filipino descent
American people of Hungarian descent
American people of Irish descent
American performers of Christian music
Catholics from Michigan
Christian music songwriters
Living people
Musicians from Ann Arbor, Michigan
Singers from Michigan
Warner Records artists
Word Records artists
21st-century American women singers
21st-century American singers